National Military Park, National Battlefield, National Battlefield Park, and National Battlefield Site are four designations for 25 battle sites preserved by the United States federal government because of their national importance. The designation applies to "sites where historic battles were fought on American soil during the armed conflicts that shaped the growth and development of the United States...."

There are eleven National Battlefields (NB), nine National Military Parks (NMP), four National Battlefield Parks (NBP), and one National Battlefield Site (NBS). The National Park Service does not distinguish among the four designations in terms of their preservation or management policies.

Seventeen sites are from the American Civil War, four from the American Revolutionary War, one from the War of 1812, one from the French and Indian War, and two were attacks on Native Americans.

In 1890, Chickamauga and Chattanooga National Military Park was the first such site created by Congress. Originally these sites were maintained by the War Department, but were transferred to the National Park Service on August 10, 1933. The different designations appear to represent Congressional attitudes at the time of authorization of each individual site, although "park" appears to be reserved for the larger sites. Only Brices Cross Roads National Battlefield Site, which is small, still bears that designation; others have since been redesignated. Some battlefields are designated as National Monuments, such as Little Bighorn Battlefield National Monument, Mill Springs Battlefield National Monument, and ten forts, several of which saw battle; National Historical Parks, such as Harpers Ferry National Historical Park and Cedar Creek and Belle Grove National Historical Park; or National Historic Sites, such as Sand Creek Massacre National Historic Site.

As with all historic areas in the National Park System, these battle sites are automatically listed on the National Register of Historic Places.

List of areas

Other battlefields in the National Park System
Mill Springs Battlefield National Monument
Little Bighorn Battlefield National Monument
Aleutian Islands World War II National Monument
Fallen Timbers Battlefield and Fort Miamis National Historic Site (affiliated area)
Washita Battlefield National Historic Site
Appomattox Court House National Historical Park
Cedar Creek and Belle Grove National Historical Park
Colonial National Historical Park
Palo Alto Battlefield National Historical Park
Arkansas Post
Several forts also saw battle.

See also

National Historical Park
List of areas in the United States National Park System

Notes

External links
 Designation of National Park System Units
 The Origin & Evolution of the National Military Park Idea by Ronald F. Lee (1973)

 
Military facilities on the National Register of Historic Places
National Register of Historic Places
Historic preservation in the United States